Donald Gary Gustavson (born July 23, 1943) is an American politician. He is a former Republican member of the Nevada Senate, representing the 14th district, formerly called Washoe District 2. He was elected to the position in 2010, running for the seat previously held by term-limited Senator Maurice Washington. Prior to serving in the Nevada Senate he was a member of the Nevada Assembly representing two districts in his six regular and six special sessions.

References

External links
 Nevada Legislature Biography - Don Gustavson
 Project Vote Smart - Don Gustavson(NV) profile

1943 births
Living people
Republican Party members of the Nevada Assembly
21st-century American politicians